The Soldier's Art is the eighth novel in Anthony Powell's twelve-volume masterpiece A Dance to the Music of Time, and the second in the war trilogy. It was published in 1966, and touches on themes of separation and unanticipated loss. It is dedicated to Powell's friend Roy Fuller.

References

External links

1966 British novels
Novels by Anthony Powell
A Dance to the Music of Time
Fiction set in 1941
Heinemann (publisher) books